Molly Baz (née Lundquist-Baz) is an American chef and food writer. She was a senior food editor at Bon Appétit magazine and appeared frequently in videos for the magazine's YouTube channel before leaving in 2020. In 2021, Baz published the cookbook Cook This Book, which became a New York Times Best Seller.

Early life and education 
Molly Lundquist-Baz is from Rhinebeck, New York. She was educated at Poughkeepsie Day School where she graduated in 2006. She then studied art history at Skidmore College in Saratoga Springs, graduating in 2010. She discovered her love of cooking while studying abroad in Florence, Italy. In her senior year at Skidmore, she and classmate Mikaela Bloomberg created P.D.E. (Private Dining Experience), a biweekly dinner prepared by the duo with local ingredients and open to the local Saratoga Springs community.

Career

Early career (2008–2014)
Wanting to become a chef without attending culinary school, Baz worked as a line cook in restaurants in Boston and New York City from 2008 to 2014. In 2011, she took a break between jobs to go on a road trip in the southern United States with her father, photographer Doug Baz, and eat at thirty one barbecue establishments and learn from barbecue pitmasters. During her time in New York, she co-founded a catering company named Rustic Supper.

Time at Bon Appétit (2015–2020) 
She worked as a recipe tester for Condé Nast's Epicurious starting in 2015 before moving to Bon Appétit, where she later became Senior Associate Food Editor in 2018. After Bon Appétit increased its focus on video content in 2016, Baz also presented on the magazine's YouTube channel with Andy Baraghani, Sohla El-Waylly, Priya Krishna, Brad Leone, and Claire Saffitz. One video series, Making Perfect, starred Baz alongside other staff of the Bon Appétit Test Kitchen and focused on cooking "perfect" versions of meals such as pizza or a Thanksgiving dinner. With Andy Baraghani and musicians Cupcakke and Ella Mai, Baz held cooking demonstrations at the Outside Lands Music and Arts Festival in San Francisco in 2019.

In June 2020, Bon Appétit editor-in-chief Adam Rapoport resigned after a photo of him in brownface garnered criticism. The resignation also came as employees, including assistant food editor Sohla El-Waylly, publicly accused the magazine and its parent company Condé Nast of discriminating against employees of color. After El-Waylly, Priya Krishna, and Rick Martinez, all people of color, announced their departure from the magazine's video content in August, Baz wrote on Instagram that she would no longer appear in videos for the magazine. She departed the publication in October.

After Bon Appétit (2020–present) 
In November 2020, Baz started a food media subscription service on Patreon named Recipe Club through which she offered weekly recipes and other content. By early December, after one month of business, Recipe Club had gained "several thousand" subscribers, according to Business Insider. Baz chose a subscription business model for Recipe Club so she could keep developing recipes and prevent herself from "going dark" before publishing her cookbook in early 2021. Also in December, Baz and Bon Appétit colleague Carla Lalli Music began a livestreamed video series on the Instagram Live platform, titled You Got Snack'd.

Baz published a cookbook, titled Cook This Book, on April 20, 2021, through the Clarkson Potter imprint. The book was critically and commercially successful, becoming a New York Times Best Seller. NPR, Food52 and Taste of Home named the book as one of the best cookbooks of 2021. A review by Publishers Weekly described the book as "an exciting crash course in cooking fundamentals." Anne Valdespino of The Mercury News wrote that Baz "just might be the Abbie Hoffman of the culinary world" as the book's title "smacks" of Hoffman's Steal This Book.

In 2022, it was announced that Baz would appear as a guest judge on the Discovery+ streaming series The Julia Child Challenge, created by the Food Network.

Personal life
Baz lives with her husband Ben Willet in East Los Angeles, California, having moved there from New York City in 2020.

References 

Date of birth missing (living people)
21st-century American non-fiction writers
21st-century American women writers
Living people
American chefs
American cookbook writers
American food writers
American women chefs
American women non-fiction writers
Bon Appétit people
Chefs from New York (state)
Skidmore College alumni
People from Rhinebeck, New York
Women cookbook writers
Writers from New York (state)
Year of birth missing (living people)